Vladimir Vasilyevich Krylov (1830 – April 1885) was a Russian Imperial Army general who served as the Minister of War of the Principality of Bulgaria (1881–1882).

Biography 
Vladimir Krylov's family originated in the Vyatka Governorate.

In 1843–1865, he served in the St. Petersburg Grenadier Regiment as a podpraporshchik. In 1853, he served in the Tomsk Regiment and fought in the Crimean War. He participated in the defense of Sevastopol.

As a major, Krylov took part in putting down a Polish uprising.

In 1869–1881, he commanded the 24th Simbirsk Infantry Regiment, with which he fought in the Russo-Turkish War (1877-1878). 

In April 1881 Krylov was promoted to major general. The next year he served as the Minister of War of the Principality of Bulgaria. It was on his initiative that several laws were introduced to and passed by the National Assembly of Bulgaria.

He left the Russian Imperial Army due to sickness and died in 1885.

Sources 
Russian Wikipedia
Bulgarian Wikipedia

1830 births
1885 deaths
Imperial Russian Army generals
Russian military personnel of the Crimean War
Russian military personnel of the Russo-Turkish War (1877–1878)
Defence ministers of Bulgaria